The Busan–Masan Uprising or shortly Buma Uprising against the Yushin regime, took place between 16 and 20 October 1979 in Busan and Masan (now a district of Changwon, South Korea). Students from Busan National University began demonstrations calling for the abolition of the Yushin regime. On 17 October the protests grew to include citizens and spread to Masan on 18 and 19 October.  It also called as Busan–Masan Democratic Uprising or Busan–Masan Democratization Movement.

President Park Chung-hee declared martial law on 18 October and referred 66 people to military court. On 20 October, Park invoked the Garrison Act. The army was mobilized, and 59 civilians were brought to military court. Six days later, Park is assassinated by his own intelligence chief.

Background
The 1978 National Assembly election was held in December and was influenced by the government. Nevertheless, the ruling Republican Party was defeated by the New Democratic Party.

In August 1979, female workers of the YH Trading Company performed a sit in at the headquarters of the New Democratic Party. Because of the lockout, the ruling Republican Party expelled Kim Young-sam from the National Assembly, leading to the resignation of all opposition party members from the National Assembly.

Progress
The protests history is as follows:
 3 May 1979 - A national convention of New Democratic Party occurred, the moderate party representative Yi Cheol-seung defected, Kim Young-sam was elected.
 11 August 1979 - A sit in held by YH Trading Company workers held at the New Democratic Party Headquarters violently suppressed by riot police resulting in the death of one female worker. Kim Young-sam arrested.
 4 October 1979 - The ruling Republicans expelled Kim Young-sam from the National Assembly.
 16 October 1979 - Busan–Masan Uprising occurred.
 17 October 1979 - Chungmu police substation, the Korea Broadcasting System, and the Busan tax office were destroyed. Police vehicles were burned and damaged.
 18 October 1979 - The government proclaimed martial law in Busan at 12:00  am. The military arrested 1,058 people, 66 of who went on to face trial.
 20 October 1979 - Governments invoke the Garrison Act at Masan.
 26 October 1979 - President Park Chung-hee was assassinated

Influence
This incident incited conflict inside the government, which led in turn to an early ending of the Yushin regime that was maintained by an emergency measure. The protest influenced the Gwangju Uprising and the June Democracy Movement.

Aftermath
Democracy Park was built in 1999, and a monument was erected to honor the participants of the protests.

See also

 People's Revolutionary Party Incident
 Gwangju Uprising
 June Democratic Uprising
 Kim Young-sam
 October Yushin

References

1979 in South Korea
Conflicts in 1979
Fourth Republic of Korea
Social movements in South Korea
History of Busan